Drunk Tank Pink is the second studio album by the British post-punk band Shame, released on 15 January 2021 through Dead Oceans.

Background 
Following the conclusion of their Songs of Praise Tour, Shame began recording new material for their second studio album. In late January 2020, NME reported that Shame was working on their second studio album and that recording had been complete.

Release
On 10 September 2020, Shame released the single "Alphabet", marking their first new material in two-and-a-half years. The same day, the band released a corresponding music video for "Alphabet", which features oversized heads in a tinsel pub. The music video was directed by Tegen Williams and produced by Kitty Wordsworth.

Two months later, on 18 November 2020, Shame released their second single, "Water in the Well", which correlated with the announcement of Drunk Tank Pink for a 15 January 2021 release date. The music video for the single was directed by Pedro Takahashi.

Drunk Tank Pink was released on 15 January 2021 during the COVID-19 pandemic in the United Kingdom. Shame anticipated going on a headlining tour in February 2021 called the Socially Distant Tour, which was played at venues that allowed for social distancing. The tour began on 2 February 2021 in Leeds and ended on 27 February in Brighton.

Artwork
The front cover of Drunk Tank Pink features a black-and-white image of Shame drummer Charlie Forbes's father, photographed by Tegen Williams. Frontman Charlie Steen explained how the album title and the text colour on the cover came to be: he painted his room pink and called it "the womb", and the colour he used is also known as "drunk tank pink", which is known to reduce aggressive behaviour and lower heart rates.

Critical reception

Drunk Tank Pink was met with widespread critical acclaim. At Metacritic, which assigns a normalised rating out of 100 to reviews from mainstream critics, the album received an average score of 82 based on 21 reviews, indicating "universal acclaim".

In a review for AllMusic, Heather Phares wrote: "Though it's named for the color used to subdue violently inebriated prisoners, there's little soothing about the band's second album; in fact, by comparison, their debut sounds almost staid. Shame sound unstoppable on Drunk Tank Pink, yet they also find new ways to channel that energy. At Clash, Erin Bashford said: "Drunk Tank Pink is a surreal landscape of desperation, frustration, and consideration, and a confident second record from the South Londoners. Each track feels like its own ecosystem, tackling its own demons and fighting with its own musical journey. It’s certainly an album created with plenty of thought and various concepts tackled within its 40-odd minutes."

Track listing

Personnel
Shame

 Charlie Steen – lead vocals , claps , guitars , additional piano , recorder 
 Eddie Green – guitars , backing vocals , claps 
 Josh Finerty – bass, backing vocals ; guitars , synthesizer , claps , percussion , drums , keyboards , piano , table 
 Sean Coyle-Smith – guitars , backing vocals , synthesizer , claps , percussion 
 Charlie Forbes – drums , percussion , claps  
Additional performers

 James Ford – percussion , synthesizer , claps , keyboards 
 Anthony Cazade – claps

Charts

References 

2021 albums
Shame (band) albums
Dead Oceans albums